Sarro (or Saro) is a village and seat of the commune of Soloba in the Cercle of Macina in the Ségou Region of southern-central Mali.

References

Populated places in Ségou Region